Tropiquaria Zoo is a small tropical house and zoo in West Somerset, England.

It is based in a 1930s art deco BBC radio transmitter hall of Washford transmitting station, which is now a Grade II listed building.

A zoo has been run from this site since the early 1990s.  There is a mainly African theme to the tropical hall and aquarium as well as the large number of outside enclosures. The zoo is a member of BIAZA, the British and Irish Association of Zoos and Aquariums, and has successfully bred a number of endangered species of mammals, reptiles, birds, and fish.

Tropiquaria includes a Tropical Hall with a variety of snakes and lizards, and birds. The zoo also features an aquarium with several species of endangered, critically endangered and even extinct in the wild species of fish.  Outside are macaws, helmeted curassow, cockatoos, parrots, agoutis, gibbons, serval, wildcats, wallabies, emus, rheas, tapir, cotton-top tamarins, red-handed tamarins, ring-tailed lemurs, ruffed lemurs, brown lemurs, coatis, yellow mongoose and meerkats amongst many others.

There is also a number of outdoor play areas, and an indoor play area and cafe.

References

External links

Tourist attractions in Somerset
Zoos in England
Buildings and structures in West Somerset